Horsemen Family is a hip hop group from New Zealand. At the 2008 New Zealand Music Awards, they were nominated for the People's Choice Award, but lost to the Parachute Band.

Discography
"Drink With Us" (2007)
"Feels Like Magic" (2007) (No. 8, NZ)

References

New Zealand hip hop groups
Universal Music Group artists